The Mackinac Bridge Walk is an annual event held every Labor Day since 1958 in Michigan in which people may walk the length of the Mackinac Bridge. Walkers are traditionally led across by the governor of Michigan.
In an average year, 40,000 to 65,000 people participate in the five-mile walk. This is nearly the combined population of the three counties connected by the bridge.

The Labor Day bridge walk is the sole exception to the rule prohibiting pedestrians on the bridge.

History

The walk was started and took place in late June 1958 during the Bridge's dedication ceremony, led by Governor G. Mennen Williams. That first year only 68 people walked across the bridge.  The walk was changed to Labor Day in 1959, and until 1964, participants in the walk alternated north and south in consecutive years.

During the 2007 bridge walk, celebrating the bridge's 50th anniversary, participation was estimated at 60,000 walkers. The record number of walkers is estimated at 85,000 in 1992 when President George H. W. Bush crossed the Mighty Mac.

Starting in 2017, all vehicular traffic on the bridge as well as shipping and boating below, is stopped during the duration of the event. The  2020 edition of the walk was cancelled as a result of the COVID-19 pandemic; the bridge authority cited logistical hurdles and falling toll revenue as reasons for the cancellation.

References

External links
 http://www.mackinacbridge.org/annual-bridge-walk-7/ - Information about the annual walk
 http://www.mightymac.org/bridgewalk.htm - Photographs and tips on the walk
 http://www.mackinacbridge.org/

Michigan culture
Tourist attractions in Mackinac County, Michigan
Tourist attractions in Emmet County, Michigan
Tourist attractions in Cheboygan County, Michigan